Plesiobasis may refer to:
 Plesiobasis (beetle), a genus of beetles in the family Anthribidae
 Plesiobasis, a genus of flies in the family Tabanidae; synonym of Mackerrasus